Kristian Sjødahl Østby (born 30 January 1996) is a Norwegian ice hockey player for Stavanger Oilers and the Norwegian national team.

He represented Norway at the 2021 IIHF World Championship.

References

External links

1996 births
Living people
Norwegian ice hockey defencemen
People from Sarpsborg
Sparta Warriors players
Stavanger Oilers players
Sportspeople from Viken (county)